Shgharshik is a village in the Talin Municipality of the Aragatsotn Province of Armenia. There is a memorial in the city remembering the Armenian genocide of 1915.

References 

Report of the results of the 2001 Armenian Census

Populated places in Aragatsotn Province